Hùnxuè'ér is a Chinese term used to refer to people of mixed race. It literally means "mixed-blood child" and is used for all mixed race people.

History
For decades following the Chinese Revolution of 1949, marriages between laowai (foreigners) and Chinese were unusual and perhaps even nonexistent during the Cultural Revolution, but they were never explicitly banned or judged unacceptable on a racial basis. It was only in the mid-1970s that the first petitions for permission to marry foreigners were accepted, with the thawing of diplomatic ties between China and the United States. Such marriages remained relatively unusual for another two decades.

From 1994 to 2008, each year has seen about 3,000 more mixed race marriages in Shanghai than the previous year. This has caused a major shift in China's attitudes to race and to Chinese children of mixed race heritage, because of globalization.

Examples 
Chloe Bennet
Maj. Art Chin (Sino-Japanese War/WWII veteran combat aviator for the Chinese Air Force)
Ding Hui
Nancy Kwan
Bruce Lee
Lin Hu
Lou Jing
Karen Mok
Anthony Wong
Celina Jade
Michelle Reis

See also
 Indo people
 Eurasian Singaporeans

References

Chinese words and phrases
Chinese culture
Ethno-cultural designations
Multiracial affairs in Asia